Mus-Khaya is a mountain in Sakha Republic, Russia and the highest point of the Suntar-Khayata Range with an elevation of .

Mus-Khaya means Icy Mountain in Sakha.

See also
 List of mountains of Russia
 List of ultras of Northeast Asia

References

External links
 "Mus-Khaya, Russia" on Peakbagger
 To the top of Mus Khaya (in Russian)
Mountains of the Sakha Republic
Highest points of Russian federal subjects
Suntar-Khayata